WestJet Encore is a Canadian regional airline headquartered in Calgary, Alberta that operates feeder flights for WestJet, owned by the same parent company WestJet Airlines, Ltd. In response to internal market studies about future growth limitations by WestJet Airlines operating only Boeing 737 aircraft, WestJet Encore was formed in 2013 to allow increased frequency of flights by using smaller aircraft, as well as to expand service to routes with less traffic.

The airline operates a fleet of turboprop aircraft: the De Havilland Canada Dash 8. They operate 47 Q400NextGen aircraft, a variant of the original De Havilland Canada Dash 8. WestJet Encore is the fourth largest operator of the Q400 series. Pilot bases are in Calgary and Toronto, where many WestJet Encore flights operate. Air service originally started in Western Canada, but routes in the eastern half of the country were added later.

The airline was initially staffed with non-union employees but the pilots and cabin crew have since unionized. WestJet Encore participates in the WestJet Rewards, a revenue-based frequent flyer program that offers flight discount rewards.

History

Market conditions leading to formation (2005–2013)

Prior to the formation of WestJet Encore, WestJet Airlines, Inc. internal studies concluded in 2005, when the company had 50 Boeing 737 aircraft, that WestJet would saturate the Canadian commercial airline market when it reached a 90–100 Boeing 737 aircraft fleet. WestJet Airlines had become the second largest airline in Canada in 2002. Solutions included slowing expansion of the airline or adding smaller aircraft models to serve routes with less traffic. The absence of turboprop aircraft in the WestJet fleet was seen as a disadvantage compared to competitor Air Canada. In some cases where Air Canada had smaller aircraft, WestJet either avoided the market or had only one daily flight using a Boeing 737, an aircraft much larger than the ones Air Canada used. Having more flights on a route than a competitor is a competitive advantage.

WestJet made an initial order of 20 Bombardier Q400 NextGen aircraft through a letter of intent on May 1, 2012, which resulted in a conditional order on June 28, 2012. A firm order of 20 Q400 NextGen and 25 options was announced on August 1, 2012. The ATR-72-600 had been considered, having a lower initial acquisition price and better fuel economy on short flights but slower speed, worse fuel economy on longer flights and slightly less passenger capacity.

Inauguration of air service and operating conditions

The parent company, WestJet Airlines, Ltd., formed WestJet Encore, that is a wholly owned but legally separate airline from WestJet. Prior to the selection of the Encore name, other names were considered, including Chinook, Echo, and Reach. Calgary was selected for the WestJet Encore corporate headquarters but Toronto Pearson International Airport was also considered. WestJet Encore received an Air Operator Certificate separate from WestJet Airlines on June 12, 2013.

On June 24, 2013, with two Q400s in its fleet, it began flights. That day, the airline flew between Calgary International Airport and Saskatoon, Nanaimo (British Columbia), and Fort St. John (British Columbia) as well as between Fort. St. John and Vancouver. The IATA assigned WestJet Encore an airline code of "WR", which had previously been used by Royal Tongan Airlines.

Some WestJet Encore flights were new routes not served by the WestJet mainline carrier because there was insufficient traffic to support Boeing 737 flights. Other WestJet Encore flights increased frequencies on existing WestJet routes. WestJet Encore's service was initially limited to Western Canada, but it opened service in the eastern part of the country in June 2014 with a route from Toronto to Thunder Bay, Ontario. It later began service on eastern routes centred on Toronto and Halifax. WestJet Encore moved into the international market in 2016, with flights serving Boston Logan Airport; Nashville International Airport was added the following year.

WestJet Encore flies Q400 NextGen on regional flights up to 700 nautical miles. 50% of WestJet Encore passengers are traveling on connecting flights with WestJet. The WestJet Encore fleet of Q400s expanded to 18 aircraft by March 2015, and later to 34 aircraft by December 2016 and to 43 aircraft by December 2017. In 2015, WestJet Encore was the fastest-growing operator of Q400 aircraft. By 2017, it was the fourth largest operator of Q400 aircraft in the world.

In August 2015, WestJet Encore adopted a revised livery. The tail and type style used with the word "WestJet" remained the same, but the teal-and-blue geometric widget ahead of the WestJet titles was replaced with a teal-and-blue stylized maple leaf with a similar pattern.

Westjet Encore has a partially unionized workforce. Initially having an entirely non-union staff, the airline became a target for union drives starting in 2014. Starting January 1, 2016, the airline management initiated WestJet Pilots Association, a subgroup of the WestJet Proactive Management Team, to ratify pilot contracts between with WestJet Encore. The pilots union which represents many pilots that fly for U.S. carriers, the Air Line Pilots Association, was successful in unionizing the 500-pilot workforce in November 2017. Pilot bases are located in Calgary and Toronto. WestJet pilots are required to be Canadian citizens or Canadian permanent residents. Pilot shortages in the airline industry have affected WestJet Encore, resulting in requirements that newly hired pilots need only 1,000 flight hours of experience prior to hiring, 
 which has been lowered to 250. Pilots are guaranteed an eventual higher paying position flying larger jets at WestJet, unlike competitor airline Jazz, which does not offer guarantees of an eventual job at Air Canada. WestJet Encore and its flight attendants reached an agreement regarding compensation and work rules beginning January 1, 2018, for a one-year period. However, the Canadian Union of Public Employees (CUPE), who was not a party to the agreement, announced that it would continue efforts to unionize the flight attendant ranks.

On October 31, 2016, a $2 billion, two million square foot international terminal for U.S. cross border and international flights opened at Calgary International Airport, the largest hub of WestJet Encore and its affiliate WestJet. Despite consultation with the airlines, the terminal design proved problematic. The Calgary Airport Authority CEO characterized the new terminal as being "long on aesthetics and short on functionality." There is reduced aircraft efficiency due to the need to tow aircraft to another concourse if an aircraft is used for both domestic and either U.S. cross border or international flights as well as the need to hire additional staff because they cannot be deployed to more than one concourse due to long walking distances. The baggage system of the new terminal is inoperable with the rest of the airport from 2016 to 2019. Passenger problems include WestJet trans-border and international gates being up to a two-kilometre walk to the domestic WestJet gates as well as lack of enough seating at the gate so passengers sit on the floor. These problems are seen as a threat to passenger traffic, which might be driven to other connecting airports, such as Seattle or Vancouver, cities that WestJet Encore has fewer or no flights serving.

Corporate affairs

Management

WestJet Encore is a wholly owned company of WestJet Airlines, Ltd. Sales and marketing of WestJet Encore flights are conducted by WestJet, An Alberta Partnership, which is jointly owned by two corporate entities owned by WestJet Airlines, Ltd.

The first president of WestJet Encore was Ferio Pugliese, who retained his title of Executive Vice President at WestJet Airlines, Ltd. He was hired in November 2012 coming from WestJet, where he began work in 2007. He left in 2016 to become an Executive Vice President at Hydro One Ltd., an electricity company and in 2018 subsequently he is now a Senior Vice-President for Air Canada.  He was replaced in September 2016 by Charles Duncan, an American who previously worked as Senior Vice President of Technical Operations at United Airlines and, earlier in his career, was Chief Operating Officer at Continental Micronesia.

Financials

Financial statistics are not released separately for WestJet Encore but reported for WestJet Airlines, Ltd., which comprises several units and the larger WestJet Airlines. WestJet Encore has increased traffic in markets that it served as well as lowered airfares 30–40% than was previously available.

Destinations

WestJet Encore flies regional routes throughout Canada, primarily to or from Calgary and Toronto. Routes include smaller cities, such as Brandon, Manitoba to Calgary, two cities with an oil industry. This new service re-introduced air service to Brandon. Other routes are increased frequencies on existing WestJet routes, such as between Calgary and Saskatoon. WestJet Encore services four destinations outside of Canada, namely Nashville, Portland, OR and Seattle. WestJet Encore operated flights between Kelowna, British Columbia and Fort McMurray, Alberta, neither a WestJet Encore hub airport, from 2014 to 2016 but discontinued flights amid a decline in the oil industry due to lower oil prices. WestJet Encore flights are numbered as flight 3100 to 3899.

Fleet

WestJet Encore operates one type of aircraft, the De Havilland Canada Dash 8-400 NextGen, an updated version of the Dash 8-400 with updated landing gear, redesigned interiors, lighting, and larger overhead cabin storage. In turn, the Dash 8-400 is an updated version of the De Havilland Canada Dash 8-400 that has active noise suppression to create a quieter passenger cabin. To prevent freezing of water lines during overnight stays at airports with cold weather, the airline rendered the water flow to the lavatory basins inoperative in 2013.

WestJet Encore uses a navAero supplied Windows-OS based electronic flight bag (EFB) that can connect to the aircraft. In conjunction with a WestJet developed Integrated Communication and Application System (ICAS), objective flight data can be shared with maintenance personnel improving aircraft efficiency. One example of use would be after an aircraft was subjected to severe turbulence, EFB and ICAS could determine whether or not objective thresholds were exceeded. If such thresholds are not exceeded, four hours of maintenance and inspection are avoided instead of having pilots subjectively characterize the level of turbulence.

As of December 2021, the WestJet Encore fleet consists of the following aircraft:

Marketing
WestJet Encore participates in WestJet Rewards, a frequent flyer program and loyalty scheme originally started by WestJet. Instead of miles or points, WestJet Dollars are earned by participants and can be redeemed as full or partial payment of future airfare. Participants earn 1% of their airfare in WestJet Dollars. Elite level participants, who spend $3000 or more per year in WestJet airfare are classified as Silver or Gold and earn a 3% or 5% rate in WestJet Dollars. WestJet also participates in WestJet Rewards as does Air France (2017–present), KLM (2017–present), Delta Airlines (2014–present), and Qantas (2016–present). WestJet Dollars earned as a base amount do not expire but bonus amounts have an expiry date.

Passengers flying on WestJet Encore may alternatively receive credit in Air France/KLM Flying Blue, Delta Skymiles, or Qantas Frequent Flyer

Cabins and services

As well as economy class seating, WestJet Encore aircraft has a designated Premium section. Unlike the Premium section on the mainline carrier, WestJet, it does not have increased legroom. The Premium section on WestJet Encore has seating in the forward part of the cabin and does not have change fees when changing flights ticketed. The majority of WestJet Encore flights do not use jet bridges and are instead ground loaded, meaning the passengers exit the terminal onto the apron before stepping on to the aircraft. WestJet Encore aircraft do not have drop down oxygen masks, which are not required by regulations due to the aircraft's certification to operate up to 25,000 feet in altitude.

Food is available for purchase.

WestJet Encore does not operate airport lounges but has arrangements with private, non-airline affiliated airport lounges where WestJet Encore passengers are extended a discount for pay-for-visit use.

See also
 WestJet Link

References

Air Transport Association of Canada
WestJet
Low-cost carriers
Companies based in Calgary
Canadian brands
Regional airline brands
Airlines established in 2013
Canadian companies established in 2013
2013 establishments in Alberta